Hobo Station may refer to:

Hobo Station, Mississippi, a community in the United States
Hobo Station (Mie), a rail station in Japan